Scott Lipsky and Rajeev Ram were the defending champions, but were defeated in the first round by wildcards Drake Bernstein and Kevin King.
Alex Bogomolov Jr. and Matthew Ebden defeated Matthias Bachinger and Frank Moser in the final, 3–6, 7–5, [10–8].

Seeds

Draw

Draw

References
 Main Draw

Atlanta Tennis Championships - Doubles
2011 Doubles